Skravena Cove is a 2.1 km wide cove indenting for 1 km the north coast of Livingston Island in the South Shetland Islands, Antarctica.  Entered between Avitohol Point and Kuklen Point.

The cove is named after the settlement of Skravena in northern Bulgaria.

Location
Spanish mapping in 1991 and Bulgarian in 2005, 2009 and 2010.

Maps
 L.L. Ivanov et al. Antarctica: Livingston Island and Greenwich Island, South Shetland Islands. Scale 1:100000 topographic map. Sofia: Antarctic Place-names Commission of Bulgaria, 2005.
 L.L. Ivanov. Antarctica: Livingston Island and Greenwich, Robert, Snow and Smith Islands. Scale 1:120000 topographic map.  Troyan: Manfred Wörner Foundation, 2009.

References
 Skravena Cove. SCAR Composite Gazetteer of Antarctica.
 Bulgarian Antarctic Gazetteer. Antarctic Place-names Commission. (details in Bulgarian, basic data in English)

External links
 Skravena Cove. Copernix satellite image

Coves of Livingston Island
Bulgaria and the Antarctic